OPIC may refer to:

Overseas Private Investment Corporation
Oral Proficiency Interview - computer (OPIc): a computerized test of English usage skills
On-line Page Importance Computation (Selection policy, fifth para)